The Petro Gazz Angels are a professional women's volleyball team playing in the Premier Volleyball League (PVL).

History 
The team debuted in the 2018 PVL Reinforced Conference. Petro Gazz Angels is primarily composed of former players from the DLSU Lady Spikers in the UAAP and the CSB Lady Blazers in the NCAA.

Current roster 

Coaching staff
 Head coach: Oliver Almadro
 Assistant coach: 
 Conditioning Coach:Paolo Rivero

Team Staff
 Team Manager:Camille Mary Arielle Cruz
 Trainer:Arnold LaniogJay Chua
 Statistician:Rald Ricafort

Medical Staff
 Physical Therapist:Rod Ann Oriel

Previous roster 

Coaching staff
 Head coach:Rald Ricafort
 Assistant coach: Arnold Laniod
 Conditioning Coach:Paolo Rivero

Team Staff
 Team Manager:Camille Mary Arielle Cruz
 Trainer:Arnold LaniogJay Chua
 Statistician:Rald Ricafort

Medical Staff
 Physical Therapist:Rod Ann Oriel 

Coaching staff
 Head coach:Jerry Yee
 Assistant coach:Rald Ricafort
 Conditioning Coach:Paolo Rivero

Team Staff
 Team Manager:Camille Mary Arielle Cruz
 Trainer:Arnold LaniogJay Chua
 Statistician:Rald Ricafort

Medical Staff
 Physical Therapist:Rod Ann Oriel 

Coaching staff
 Head coach:Jerry Yee
 Assistant coach:Rald Ricafort
 Conditioning Coach:Paolo Rivero

Team Staff
 Team Manager:Camille Mary Arielle Cruz
 Trainer:Arnold LaniogJay Chua
 Statistician:Rald Ricafort

Medical Staff
 Physical Therapist:Rod Ann Oriel 

Coaching staff
 Head coach:Arnold Laniog
 Assistant coach:Rald Ricafort
 Conditioning Coach:Paolo Rivero

Team Staff
 Team Manager:Camille Mary Arielle Cruz
 Trainer:Arnold LaniogJay Chua
 Statistician:Rald Ricafort

Medical Staff
 Physical Therapist:Rod Ann Oriel

Coaching staff
 Head coach:Arnold Laniog
 Assistant coaches:Rald Ricafort
 Conditioning Coach:Paolo Rivero

Team Staff
 Team Manager:Camille Mary Arielle Cruz
 Trainer:Arnold LaniogJay Chua
 Statistician:Rald Ricafort

Medical Staff
 Physical Therapist:Rod Ann Oriel

Coaching staff
 Head coach: Arnold Laniog
 Assistant coaches: Rald Ricafort
 Conditioning Coach: Paolo Rivero

Team Staff
 Team Manager: Camille Mary Arielle Cruz
 Trainer: Arnold Laniog Jay Chua
 Statistician: Rald Ricafort
Medical Staff
 Physical Therapist: Rod Ann Oriel

Legend
 Team Captain
 Outside Hitter
 Opposite Hitter
 Setter
 Libero
 Middle Blocker
 Import
 Draft Pick
 Rookie
 Inactive
 Suspended
 Free Agent

Coaching staff
 Head coach: Jerry Yee
 Assistant coaches: Arnold Laniog Norman Miguel
 Conditioning Coach: Paolo Rivero

Team Staff
 Team Manager: Camille Mary Arielle Cruz
 Trainer: Arnold Laniog Jay Chua
 Statistician: Rald Ricafort
Medical Staff
 Physical Therapist: Rod Ann Oriel

Legend
 Team Captain
 Outside Hitter
 Opposite Hitter
 Setter
 Libero
 Middle Blocker
 Import
 Draft Pick
 Rookie
 Inactive
 Suspended
 Free Agent

Coaching staff
 Head coach: Jerry Yee
 Assistant coaches: Norman Miguel Arnold Laniog
 Conditioning Coach: Paolo Rivero

Team Staff
 Team Manager: Camille Mary Arielle Cruz
 Trainer: Arnold Laniog Jay Chua
 Statistician: Rald Ricafort
Medical Staff
 Physical Therapist: Rod Ann Oriel

Legend
 Team Captain
 Outside Hitter
 Opposite Hitter
 Setter
 Libero
 Middle Blocker
 Import
 Draft Pick
 Rookie
 Inactive
 Suspended
 Free Agent

Honors

Team 
Premier Volleyball League:

2021 PNVF Champions League:

Individual

Team captains 
  Stephanie Mercado (2018)
  Janisa Johnson (2019)
  Relea Ferina Saet (2019 - present)

Imports 

 Notes

Coaches 
  Jerry Yee (2018, 2022)
  Arnold Laniog (2019–2021)
  Rald Ricafort (2022)
  Oliver Almadro (2023 - present)

Former players 

Local players

 Rachel Anne Austero
 Maricar Nepomuceno-Baloaloa
 Ranya Musa
 Cherry Rose Nunag
 Marites Pablo
 Jeanette Panaga
 Jovielyn Grace Prado
 Frances Xinia Molina
 Jeushl Wensh Tiu
 Stephanie Mercado-de Koenigswarter
 Alyssa Gayle Layug
 Kathleen Faith Arado
 Marivic Velaine Meneses

Foreign players

 Wilma Salas

 Kadi Kullerkann

 Olena Lymareva-Flink
 Anastasiya Trach

 Janisa Johnson

References 

Premier Volleyball League (Philippines)
2018 establishments in the Philippines
Women's volleyball teams in the Philippines